Energy Rekords is a record label formed in 1990 by the merging of the three labels: Front Music Production, Electronic Beat Association, and Energy - all small labels run from the Swedish town of Älmhult. By banding together these labels' founders Håkan Ehrnst, Krister Svensson and Per Faeltenborg formed a foundation for the Swedish electronic music in the 1990s by signing up new emerging artists like S.P.O.C.K and Daily Planet as well as veterans such as Page, Blue for Two, and Oil in the Eye from the UK.

During the first half of the 1990s, the label was considered to be the leading Swedish alternative electronic music label and hosted the annual Virtual X-mas party at Mejeriet in Lund, Sweden for many years. In 1995, Energy Rekords opened up two sub labels targeted towards different markets; the "Beat That!" label for indie pop/rock and the Cascade label for techno/dance style music.

In 1998, Energy Rekords merged with October Records and added that label's bands to its roster.

Roster
Brave New World
Cat Rapes Dog
Children Within
Das Ich
Die Krupps
Diskodiktator
Elegant Machinery
EnCounter
Forbidden Colours
Front 242
Frontline Assembly
In Strict Confidence
Iris
Kiethevez
LCD
Oil in the Eye
Peter Bjorn and John
Pouppée Fabrikk
Project-X
Proxy
Rational Youth
Robert Marlow
Scapa Flow
Sista Mannen På Jorden
Slagsmålsklubben
S.P.O.C.K
The Nine
VNV Nation
Welle: Erdball

See also
 List of record labels
 Deep Shag Records

References

External links
 Official site
 Releases on Discogs.com

Swedish record labels
Record labels established in 2005
Electronic music record labels
Industrial record labels
Synth-pop record labels
Alternative rock record labels